The Old Hendry County Courthouse (constructed in 1926) is a historic courthouse in LaBelle, Florida, located at the corner of Bridge Street and Hickpochee Avenue. It was designed in the Mediterranean Revival-Mission Revival styles by architect Edward Columbus Hosford. On November 8, 1990, it was added to the U.S. National Register of Historic Places.

References

External links

 Hendry County listings at National Register of Historic Places
 Florida's Office of Cultural and Historical Programs
 Hendry County listings
 Old Hendry County Courthouse
 Hendry County Courthouse at Florida's Historic Courthouses
 Florida's Historic Courthouses by Hampton Dunn

County courthouses in Florida
Buildings and structures in Hendry County, Florida
Courthouses on the National Register of Historic Places in Florida
Edward Columbus Hosford buildings
Mediterranean Revival architecture in Florida
Mission Revival architecture in Florida
Clock towers in Florida
Government buildings completed in 1926
National Register of Historic Places in Hendry County, Florida
1926 establishments in Florida